Look Both Ways may also refer to:

 Look Both Ways (2005 film), an Australian film
 Look Both Ways (2022 film), an American film
 Look Both Ways (album), a 2017 album by Steamchicken
 Look Both Ways, an album by The Crossing (band)
 Look Both Ways (novel), a 2019 novel by Jason Reynolds
 Look Both Ways: Bisexual Politics, a memoir by Jennifer Baumgardner
 Look Both Ways: Illustrated Essays on the Intersection of Life and Design, a non-fiction book by Debbie Millman